"A block reflector is an orthogonal, symmetric matrix that reverses a subspace whose dimension may be greater than one."

It is built out of many elementary reflectors.

It is also referred to as a triangular factor, and is a triangular matrix and they are used in the Householder transformation.

A reflector  belonging to  can be written in the form :

LAPACK routines
Here are some of the LAPACK routines that apply to block reflectors
 "*larft" forms the triangular vector T of a block reflector H=I-VTVH.
 "*larzb" applies a block reflector or its transpose/conjugate transpose as returned by "*tzrzf" to a general matrix.
 "*larzt" forms the triangular vector T of a block reflector H=I-VTVH as returned by "*tzrzf".
 "*larfb" applies a block reflector or its transpose/conjugate transpose to a general rectangular matrix.

See also
 Reflection (mathematics)
 Householder transformation
 Unitary matrix
 Triangular matrix

References

Matrices